Steel Town is a 1952 American film noir action film directed by George Sherman and starring Ann Sheridan, John Lund, and Howard Duff. Made in technicolor, location shooting took place at the Kaiser Steel Mill in Fontana, California with the remainder shot at Universal City. The film's sets were designed by the art directors Robert Clatworthy and Bernard Herzbrun.

Plot
An attractive woman everybody knows as "Red" runs a restaurant. Her boyfriend Jim Denko, who works at the Kostane steel plant, comes to the restaurant for dinner, but when Red gives his steak away to a customer, words are exchanged and the men get into a fight.

It turns out the newcomer is boarding with the McNamara family—in Red's own room, in fact—and Red remains unaware that he is Steve Kostane, nephew of the steel company's owner. Red feels guilty about the fight and buys him a new jacket to replace the one that's ripped.

Not until girlfriend Valerie phones to ask for Steve Kostane by name does Red realize who he really is. But when Jim picks her up for a date, Steve sidetracks them by offering Jim money for a guided tour of the plant.

Steve begins work there the next day, surprising Jim with his effort. He becomes better acquainted with Red and breaks up with Valerie, but is blamed for a costly mistake at the factory when others don't realize that Steve was actually aiding Red's dad Mac McNamara in an emergency.

Red isn't sure how she feels about Steve until her father has another health crisis at work. Steve saves his life, and Red knows this is the man for her.

Cast
 Ann Sheridan as "Red" McNamara
 John Lund as Steve Kostane
 Howard Duff as Jim Denko
 William Harrigan as Mac McNamara
 Eileen Crowe as Millie McNamara
 Chick Chandler as Ernie
 James Best as Joe Rakich
 Nancy Kulp as Dolores, waitress
 Elaine Riley as 	Valerie
 Tudor Owen as 	McIntosh 
 Don Dillaway as Collin 
 Gino Corrado as Diner Chef
 Lois Wilde as Nurse 
 Frank Marlowe as 	Taxi Driver 
 James Dime as Restaurant Customer

Production
Jeff Chandler was originally announced to play the male lead.

References

External links
 

1952 films
1950s action drama films
Films directed by George Sherman
American action drama films
1952 drama films
1950s English-language films
1950s American films